Two vessels of the British Royal Navy have been named HMS Hibiscus, after the hibiscus flower.

  was an  sloop in use from 1917 to 1923.

Royal Navy ship names